Glauchau is a town in the German federal state of Saxony, on the right bank of the Mulde, 7 miles north of Zwickau and 17 miles west of Chemnitz by rail (its train station is on the Dresden–Werdau line). It is part of the Zwickau district.

History
Glauchau was founded by a colony of Sorbs and Wends, and belonged to the lords of Schönburg as early as the 12th century.

Sights
Some portions of the extensive old castle date from the 12th century, and the Gottesacker church contains interesting antiquarian relics.

Notable people
Johann Pfeffinger (1493–1573), theologian and Protest reformer
Georg Agricola (1494–1555), scholar and scientist
Samuel von Pufendorf (1632–1694), jurist, economist and historian
Ernst Friedrich Germar (1786–1853), professor of mineralogy, entomologist and local politician
Julius Heinrich Petermann (1801–1876), Orientalist
Ernst Kals (1905–1979), submarine commander
Walter Schlesinger (1908–1984), historian
Joachim, Count of Schönburg-Glauchau (1929–1998), politician, writer, Bundestag deputy of the CDU 1990–1994
Dieter Erler (1939–1998), footballer
Christine Spielberg (born 1941), discus thrower
Torsten May (born 1969), boxer

Twin towns – sister cities

Glauchau is twinned with:
 Grenay, France (1996)
 Iserlohn, Germany (1991)
 Jibou, Romania (2005)
 Lynchburg, United States (2007)
 Vermelles, France (1998)
 Zgierz, Poland (1996)

Gallery

References

External links

Glauchau Notgeld (emergency banknotes) Small currency notes from Glauchau depicting the story of how the Buttermilchturm (Buttermilk tower) got its name. webgerman.com/Notgeld/
Glauchau Notgeld (emergency banknotes) Small currency notes from Glauchau depicting the story of the Saxon Beer wars of 1731. webgerman.com/Notgeld/

Zwickau (district)